Nash & Sawyer Location, New Hampshire, is a historic designation of part of Coos County, which was shown on the 1896 topographic map of the area north of Crawford Notch. It contained the areas now known as Bretton Woods and Fabyans, each annexed by the town of Carroll before 1935.

In 1771, Timothy Nash and Benjamin Sawyer proved that a horse could be brought through the pass, thereby showing that a road may be feasible as well.  Sawyer Pond (Bemis Lake) and the Sawyer River, near Notchland, are also named for Benjamin Sawyer.

See also 
Crawford family of the White Mountains
Defunct placenames of New Hampshire
Lancaster, New Hampshire, reference to early grantees Sawyer and Nash
Samuel Bemis, another local pioneer, owner of Notchland
New Hampshire Historical Marker No. 186: Sawyer's Rock

References 
Mudge, John T.B., The White Mountains: Names, Places & Legends, 1995, Durand Press, 
Mount Washington, New Hampshire quadrangle maps:
1896 Topographic map at University of New Hampshire
1935 Topo of same area

History of New Hampshire
Former populated places in New Hampshire